Gadirtha impingens is a moth of the family Nolidae first described by Francis Walker in 1858. It is found from northern India and southern China to Queensland, the Bismarck Archipelago and the Solomon Islands, as well in Japan (Honshu, Shikoku, Kyushu, Tsushima). The habitat consists of lowland areas up to 2,600 meters, but it is most frequent at elevations ranging from 1,000 to 2,000 meters.

The larvae feed on Sapium and Stillingia species.

Subspecies
Gadirtha impingens impingens
Gadirtha impingens guineana Swinhoe, 1918 (New Guinea)
Gadirtha impingens tinctoides Snellen, 1877 (Sundaland to the Moluccas)
Gadirtha impingens uniformis Sugi, 1982 (north-eastern Himalaya)

References

Moths described in 1858
Eligminae